A Brand New Hero is a 1914 American short comedy film directed by and starring Fatty Arbuckle.

Cast
 Roscoe 'Fatty' Arbuckle

See also
 List of American films of 1914
 Fatty Arbuckle filmography

References

External links
 

1914 films
Films directed by Roscoe Arbuckle
Silent American comedy films
1914 comedy films
1914 short films
American silent short films
American black-and-white films
American comedy short films
1910s American films